District 26 of the Oregon State Senate comprises all of Hood River County, as well as parts of Clackamas and Multnomah counties. It is currently represented by Republican Chuck Thomsen of Hood River.

Election results
District boundaries have changed over time, therefore, senators before 2013 may not represent the same constituency as today. From 1993 until 2003, the district covered parts of Southern Oregon, and from 2003 until 2013 it covered a slightly different area in north-central Oregon.

References

26
Clackamas County, Oregon
Hood River County, Oregon
Multnomah County, Oregon